"We Are The Greatest" is a song by German group Scooter. It was released as a double a-side with their cover of "I Was Made for Lovin' You" on 21 September 1998. Both original versions of the songs are taken from the group's fifth studio album No Time to Chill. However, "We Are The Greatest" is remixed and has new vocals from HP compared to the album version.

Track listing
CD Single
"We Are the Greatest" (3:27)
"I Was Made for Lovin' You" (3:32)
"We Are the Greatest" (Extended) (4:35)
"Greatest Beats" (3:05)

12-inch Single
"We Are the Greatest" (Extended) (4:35)
"We Are the Greatest" (3:27)
"I Was Made for Lovin' You" (3:32)

Samples
"We Are The Greatest" samples the 1983 single "Street Dance" by rap act Break Machine and the lyrics of the 1985 song "Don't Stop The Rock" by Freestyle.

Chart performance

References

Scooter (band) songs
1998 singles